Herbert Lyon (29 April 1867 – 7 December 1951) was a Jersey first-class cricketer and educator.

The son of William Lyon, he was born at Saint Helier in April 1869. He was educated at Winchester College, before going up to Corpus Christi College, Oxford. While studying at Oxford, he made three appearances in first-class cricket for Oxford University, playing against the Marylebone Cricket Club in 1887 and the touring Australians and the Gentlemen of England in 1890. Lyon had little success in these three matches, scoring just 13 runs.

After graduating from Oxford, he became a schoolmaster at Bilton Grange in 1891. He later became the headmaster of Allen House School at Woking. Lyon died at Woking in December 1951.

References

External links

1867 births
1951 deaths
People from Saint Helier
People educated at Winchester College
Alumni of Corpus Christi College, Oxford
Jersey cricketers
Oxford University cricketers
Jersey schoolteachers